The James W. Norman Gym is a historic building on the campus of the University of Florida in Gainesville, Florida, United States. The facility was designed by Rudolph Weaver and built in 1932. It is located on U.S. Route 441, near the southwest corner of Southwest 3rd Avenue and 12th Street in Gainesville.

See also
University of Florida
Buildings at the University of Florida
University of Florida College of Education

External links
 Specific Info about the facility

Buildings at the University of Florida
University of Florida
1932 establishments in Florida
University and college buildings completed in 1932